The Mercedes-Benz Vision SLA was a concept car that was shown at the Detroit International Auto Show in January 2000. Concept car was constructed by Stola in late 1999.

The body was constructed with aluminum and plastic to keep the weight down, and its distinctive pointed front design became a feature of the 2004 Mercedes-Benz SLK. The SLA's engine was a 4-cylinder 1.9 L from the A-Class, producing .

References

Vision SLA